This is a list of alleged sightings of unidentified flying objects or UFOs in Belgium.

1989-1990 

 A series of triangular UFOs were reported on the skies of Belgium between 1989-1990. They were chased down by F-16 fighter jets and photographs were taken. They were suspected to be a stealth F-117 using the Belgian highways as a flight path.

1990-03-30
 Mass sighting of large, silent, low-flying black triangles in Ans, Wallonia, which were tracked by multiple NATO radar and jet interceptors, and investigated by Belgium's military. Photographic evidence exists. One close encounter was reported.

External links 
 MUFON - Last 20 UFO Sightings and Pictures

Belgium
Historical events in Belgium